Amirullah Marwat is a Pakistani politician and retired Pakistani Army officer who had been a member of the National Assembly of Pakistan, from September 2013 to May 2018.

He is a retired Pakistani Army colonel.

Political career

Marwat was elected to the National Assembly of Pakistan as a candidate of Pakistan Tehreek-e-Insaf from Constituency NA-27 (Lakki Marwat) in by-elections held following the 2013 Pakistani general election. The seat was earlier won by Maulana Fazal-ur-Rehman in 2013 general elections and later vacated in order to retain the seat won in his home constituency NA-24 (D.I.Khan).Marwat was chosen as the chairman of the National Commission for Human Development in January 2019.
Col retd Dr Amirullah Marwat remained chairman National Assembly standing committee on Federal education and professional training during his tenure as MNA. Now Col Amirullah Marwat is the chairman National commission for Human Development since January 2019.

References

Living people
Pakistan Tehreek-e-Insaf MNAs
Pashtun people
Pakistani MNAs 2013–2018
Year of birth missing (living people)